Neothais is a genus of sea snails, marine gastropod mollusks in the subfamily Rapaninae  of the family Muricidae, the murex snails or rock snails.

Species
Species within the genus Neothais include:
Neothais harpa (Conrad, 1837)
 † Neothais lassa Marwick, 1948 
 Neothais marginatra (Blainville, 1832)
Neothais nesiotes (Dall, 1908)
Neothais smithi (Brazier, 1889)
Species brought into synonymy
 Neothais clathrata (A. Adams, 1854): synonym of Coralliophila clathrata (A. Adams, 1854)
 Neothais scalaris (Menke, 1829): synonym of Dicathais orbita (Gmelin, 1791)

References

 Claremont M., Vermeij G.J., Williams S.T. & Reid D.G. (2013) Global phylogeny and new classification of the Rapaninae (Gastropoda: Muricidae), dominant molluscan predators on tropical rocky seashores. Molecular Phylogenetics and Evolution 66: 91–102.

External links
 Iredale, T. (1912). New generic names and new species of marine Mollusca. Proceedings of the Malacological Society of London. 10(3): 217-228, pl. 9
 Tan K. S. (2003) Phylogenetic analysis and taxonomy of some southern Australian and New Zealand Muricidae (Mollusca: Neogastropoda). Journal of Natural History 37(8): 911-1028

 
Muricidae